A sell-side analyst works for a brokerage firm and evaluates companies for future earnings growth and other investment criteria. They sometimes place recommendations on stocks or other securities, typically phrased as "buy", "sell", or "hold." They offer their recommendations to clients.  A proper title for some sell-side analysts is Equity or Credit Research Analyst.

See also
Buy-side analyst

Securities research
Trade idea
Financial analysts